The Diabolical Dr. Z is a 1965 horror film directed by Jesús Franco. The film stars Mabel Karr as Irma Zimmer, a surgeon who creates a machine that turns people into zombified slaves. Ms. Zimmer is the daughter of a Professor Zimmer (a disciple of Dr. Orloff), who was hounded to his death several years earlier by four of his scientific associates. Zimmer uses the machine to control an erotic dancer named Miss Muerte (Estella Blain) who uses her long poison-tipped fingernails to murder the people Ms. Zimmer holds responsible for her father's death.

Cast
 Estella Blain
 Mabel Karr
 Howard Vernon
 Marcelo Arroita Jauregui
 Jesús Franco
 Antonio Escribano
 Daniel White

Production
The Diabolical Dr. Z was written and Jean-Claude Carrière based on a story by director Jesús Franco. The film is loosely based on the 1940 novel The Bride Wore Black. The film's opening credits state that it is based on "a novel by David Khune" which is an alter-ego for director Jesús Franco. Franco would later re-use elements from the plot of The Diabolical Dr. Z in his later films including The Blood of Fu Manchu (1968) and She Killed in Ecstasy (1971).

Despite being one of Franco's favourite films of his earlier period, Franco has stated that the film "shouldn't have been made... Censorship was causing me troubles."

Release
The Diabolical Dr. Z was released in Spain in August 1966 under the title Miss Muerte with a running time of 86 minutes. The film had 360,990 admissions in Spain and grossed a 2019 equivalent of 30,787.00€ domestically. It was released in France on 13 September 1967 under the title of Dans les griffes du maniaque with a running time of 88 minutes. It was dubbed in English and shown theatrically in the U.S. in 1967.

The Diabolical Dr. Z was released on DVD by the Mondo Macabro label on 29 April 2003. A Blu-ray was released by Kino International in 2018, with Budd Wilkins of Slant Magazine noting that it surpassed the "already visually impressive" DVD from Mondo Macabro.

Reception
In a contemporary review, the Monthly Film Bulletin noted that Franco "shows an eye for unusual images-notably in Miss Death's bizarre but rather tame dance act"

From retrospective reviews, The online film database Allmovie gave the film three stars, praising it as "One of Franco's most entertaining films, Miss Muerte is a great improvement over the similar El Secreto del Dr. Orloff"

See also 

List of French films of 1966
List of horror films of 1966
List of Spanish films of 1966

References

Footnotes

Sources

External links
 

1966 horror films
Spanish horror films
French horror films
French black-and-white films
Spanish black-and-white films
Films directed by Jesús Franco
1966 films
Films produced by Serge Silberman
Films with screenplays by Jean-Claude Carrière
1960s French films